The Betar Movement, also spelled Beitar, is a Revisionist Zionist youth movement founded in 1923 in Riga, Latvia, by Vladimir (Ze'ev) Jabotinsky. Chapters sprang up across Europe, even during World War II. After the war and during the settlement of what became Israel, Betar was traditionally linked to the original Herut and then Likud political parties of Jewish pioneers. It was closely affiliated with the pre-Israel Revisionist Zionist paramilitary group Irgun Zevai Leumi. It was one of many right-wing movements and youth groups arising at that time that adopted special salutes and uniforms.  Some of the most prominent politicians of Israel were Betarim in their youth, most notably prime ministers Yitzhak Shamir and Menachem Begin, an admirer of Jabotinsky.

Today, Betar promotes Jewish leadership on university campuses as well as in local communities. Its history of empowering Jewish youth dates back to before the establishment of the State of Israel. Throughout World War II, Betar was a major source of recruits for both the Jewish regiments that fought the Nazis alongside the British and the Jewish forces that waged an ongoing guerrilla war against the British in Palestine. Across Europe, Betar militias played major roles in independently resisting Nazi forces and their various assaults on Jewish communities.

History

Betar was founded by Ze'ev Jabotinsky at a meeting of Jewish youth in Riga, Latvia, arranged by Aaron Propes in 1923. Jabotinsky spoke of the Arab attacks on the settlement of Tel Hai and other Jewish settlements in the Galilee. He believed that these incidents,  indicative of serious threats to the Jewish Palestinians, could only be addressed by the recreation of the ancient Jewish state of Israel, extending across the entirety of both Palestine and Jordan. This is the defining philosophy of Revisionist Zionism. Jabotinsky proposed creating Betar to foster a new generation of Jews thoroughly indoctrinated in these nationalist ideals and trained for military action against all enemies of Judaism. In 1931, Jabotinsky was elected  rosh Betar ("head of Betar") at the first world conference in Danzig.

Joseph Trumpeldor, the leader of the Jewish settlers who were killed at Tel Hai in 1920, served as the primary role model of the Betar. A disabled man with only one arm, he led his people in the futile defense of the settlement and reportedly died with the words, "Never mind, it is good to die for our country" (Hebrew: "אין דבר ,טוב למות בעד ארצנו"). This was particularly significant given that the Jews did not yet have a country: Trumpeldor was referring to sacrificing one's life in order to further the establishment of an independent Jewish state. The words of Shir Betar ("The Betar Song"), written by Jabotinsky, include a line that quotes Trumpeldor's last words of "never mind". As the song expresses, Betar youth were to be as "proud, generous, and fierce [alternately translated as 'cruel']" as Trumpeldor, and as ready to sacrifice themselves for Israel.

The name Betar בית"ר refers to both the last Jewish fort to fall in the Bar Kokhba revolt (136 CE) and to the altered abbreviation of the Hebrew name of the organisation, "Berit Trumpeldor" or "Brit Yosef Trumpeldor" ( ברית יוסף תרומפלדור ). Although Trumpeldor's name is properly spelt with tet (ט), it was written with taf (ת) so as to produce the acronym.

Despite resistance from both Zionist and non-Zionist Jews, Betar quickly gained a large following in Poland, Palestine, Latvia, Lithuania, Austria, Czechoslovakia, Germany, and elsewhere. It was particularly successful in Poland, which had the largest Jewish population in Europe at the time.

In 1934, Poland was home to 40,000 of Betar's 70,000 members. Routine Betar activities in Warsaw included military drilling, instruction in Hebrew, and encouragement to learn English. Militia groups organized by Betar Poland helped to defend against attacks by the anti-Semitic ONR. The interwar Polish government helped Betar with military training.
Some members admired the Polish nationalist camp and imitated some of its aspects.

Throughout the 1930s and early 1940s, Betar aided the widespread immigration of Jews to Palestine in violation of the British Mandate's immigration quotas, which had not been increased despite the surge of refugees from the Nazi persecution and murder of Jews. In total, Betar was responsible for the entrance of over 40,000 Jews into Palestine under such restrictions.

During World War II, Betar members, including former Polish Army officers, founded Żydowski Związek Wojskowy (ŻZW; "Jewish Military Union"), which fought in the Warsaw Ghetto Uprising. Mordechai Anielewicz, the head of the other major uprising group, Żydowska Organizacja Bojowa (ZOB; "Jewish Combat Organization"), also gained his military training in Betar. He was the secretary of the prominent Betar Warsaw organization in 1938. He left it to join and quickly take leadership of the left-wing Zionist Hashomer Hatzair group in Warsaw.

In the summer of 1941, Julek (Joel/Jakób) Brandt, a Betar leader from Chorzów who was a relative of Samuel Brandt, the chairman of the Hrubieszów Judenrat (Jewish Council), arranged for several hundred Betar members from the Warsaw Ghetto to work on local farms and estates, including one in Dłużniów and Werbkowice. Most of the Betar youth were killed in the spring of 1942 and in subsequent months, together with the local Jewish population. A small number, however, returned to the ghetto and later took part in the Warsaw Ghetto uprising in the ranks of the ŻZW. Brandt escaped from a transport heading for the death camp at Sobibor. He was denounced by local peasants who turned him over to the Gestapo in Hrubieszów. There, he was put to work by Gestapo Obersturmbannführer Ebner, who named him chief of a small work camp. At the end of 1942 or the beginning of 1943, Ebner shot and killed him.

Jewish fighters under the leadership of Josef Glazman, head of Betar Lithuania, battled the Nazis alongside the Lithuanian partisans in the forests outside Vilnius; anti-Nazi partisans in most other nations, however, were unwilling to fight alongside Betar. The Song Of The Partisans, an anthem traditionally sung by Holocaust survivors on Yom HaShoah, was written in memory of and dedication to Glazman.

In 1938, David Raziel became the head of both Betar and the Irgun Zvai Leumi ("National Military Organisation", known as "Etzel"). The Irgun's anthem was the third and final verse of the Betar song. Raziel died shortly into World War II, while taking part in Iraq in the Habbaniyeh area of Anbar Province in a failed British sabotage mission against German interests.

The tactics of the Irgun-Betar coalition were at odds with the mainstream Zionist establishment's policy of restraint in response to Arab attacks. Throughout most of the 1930s and '40s, the two organizations typically bombed collections of Arab civilians in response to any attack of any kind on any Palestinian Jews.  The Irgun worked closely with Betar in Palestine and worldwide, particularly with respect to illegal immigration into Palestine, but they remained organizationally and structurally separate. As British policy and Jewish needs/demands grew more opposed, Betar and the Irgun stepped up their military campaign against the British, based primarily on guerrilla tactics of sabotage and assassination.

With the outbreak of World War II, Raziel and Jabotinsky declared an unconditional ceasefire against the British, as Britain and the Zionists had a common enemy in Germany. Raziel's second-in-command, Avraham "Yair" Stern, broke away and formed the Stern Group, later renamed LEHI (Lohamei Herut Yisrael, "Freedom Fighters For Israel"), which continued to attack British targets. Radical elements of Betar joined LEHI but most stayed with the Irgun.

Future Israeli Prime Minister Menachem Begin, who had headed Betar Poland prior to World War II, reached Palestine at the war's end and took immediate control of both Betar Palestine and the Irgun. He led the two organizations in their contribution to the 1948–49 war that established the initial borders of the newly proclaimed state of Israel. Betar and the Irgun remained functionally intermingled, consistently sharing leadership and manpower. By contrast, the Haganah, the official defense organization of the Jewish Agency, and its military wing, the Palmach, had practically no Betar members.

Members of Betar were also instrumental in setting up Israel's navy, the Israeli Sea Corps. The first Israeli plane was flown into Palestine by Jabotinsky's son, Eri, at the time a member of the Betar World Executive.

Many of Israel's most prominent conservatives have been "graduates" of Betar, including former prime ministers Menachem Begin, Yitzhak Shamir, and Ehud Olmert, and former Defense Minister Moshe Arens. Former Likud/Kadima minister (in several offices) Tzipi Livni MK was a youth Betarist. Yoel Hasson MK was formerly national head of Betar in Israel. Livni and Hasson later formed Hatnuah, which in 2015 allied with Labor in the center-left Zionist Union. Israel's current Ambassador to the UN, Danny Danon, is a Betarist and a former leader of the World Betar Organization.

Since the 1970s, Betar has suffered a decline in membership and activities. It remains much involved in Zionist activism, however. Tagar, Betar's young adult movement, was active on many university campuses throughout North America during the 1980s, as part of the Revisionist Zionist Association, and Betar played a major part in raising the awareness of Soviet oppression of Jews, and fighting for the right of Soviet Jews to emigrate to Israel. It remains relatively prominent in Australia and in Cleveland, Ohio.

In the early 21st century, Betar had around 21,000 members globally.

Most recently, in 2014, Betar organized marches and demonstrations in France, to protest the rise in anti-semitic incidents there, including attacks against synagogues and individual Jews. At those marches, some Betar members displayed the emblem formerly used by the Jewish Defense League.

Regional activities

Israel

Once a vibrant movement tied to the opposition Herut Party, Betar's following in Israel has declined since the 1970s due to a generally transformed political landscape. An important change has been the rise of religious conservatives in Israel. Though Betar had many of the same political goals as the rapidly growing Gush Emunim ("Bloc of the Faithful") and Bnei Akiva youth movements (tied to the National Religious Party), they remained a secular movement. They did not join the latter organizations in seeking annexation of the contested West Bank and Gaza Strip. During the 1980s, as a result of the Camp David Accords negotiated by Menachem Begin (the leader of Herut and its successor movement Likud), a similar effect occurred due to the rise of the "Secular Right". The more extreme movements drew youth away from Betar.

As the Likud party under Benjamin Netanyahu moved away from the traditional values of Revisionist Zionism, Betar drew criticism from Israeli conservatives who identified as ideological purists. While Betar had consistently been a source of powerful political figures in Israel, its leaders were criticized for placing partisan political expediency above greater ideological priorities. In the late 1990s, Benny Begin broke away from Likud to form Herut – The National Movement.

Canada
Betar Toronto currently focuses on opposing the Israeli apartheid analogy. In February 2006 at the University of Toronto, Tagar organized a "Know Radical Islam Week" featuring activist Nonie Darwish, former Sudanese slave Simon Deng, Dr. Salim Mansur (a Muslim activist speaking on gay rights in the Middle East), and presentations by Honest Reporting and Palestinian Media Watch.

 The event was also co-sponsored by the Toronto Secular Alliance and other allied groups. Betar has also worked in Toronto and Montreal with off-campus organizations, such as the Canadian Coalition for Democracies, to promote the importance of secular and participatory politics in Canada. In March 2007, Betar-Tagar at the University of Toronto changed its name to 'Zionists at U of T'.

Betar-Tagar was active in Montreal and Toronto during the 1980s Lebanon-Israel conflict. A revival of Betar occurred in Montreal on November 9, 2006, as an event entitled "Taking Liberties: Terrorism in the West". It featured keynote speaker Dr. Salim Mansur and was the first film screening of Obsession: Radical Islam's War Against the West at McGill University. It was co-organized with Conservative McGill students. At McGill University in March 2007, Betar Montreal held a "Radical Islam Awareness Week" similar to the one at the University of Toronto the year before. Speakers included David B. Harris, a Canadian lawyer and security specialist, and John Thompson of the Mackenzie Institute. Concurrent with the 2007 Montreal program, Betar in Toronto held "Freedom and Democracy Week" at the University of Toronto. Speakers included Ezra Levant, co-founder of the Western Standard newspaper, and Jonah Goldberg of the National Review.

United States

The first branch of Betar in the United States was founded in October 1929, led principally by Joseph Beder, William Katz, Haim Messer, and Israel Posnansky. Beder had visited Palestine under the Mandate in the spring of 1929 and come in contact with Betar members there.  The first activity of Betar USA was a Hanukkah party alongside local branches which existed already in eastern New York and the Lower East Side.

When the USSR imprisoned the ailing Dr. Mikhail Stern because his sons were openly Zionist, seven Betarim from New York City went to the USSR and offered to and serve his sentence in his stead. The Soviet government refused their proposal and deported them. The group was led by Fred Pierce and included Elie Yossef and Gilad Freund.

Betar maintains a Shaliach in New York City and Cleveland, Ohio.  The Cleveland chapter offers a fall and spring camp that is open to all cities.  Betar offers summer and winter tours of Israel. It is one of the few movements that offer students a chance to visit the West Bank.  Both programs allow students to spend time at Kedumin, Itamar, Alon Moreh East Jerusalem, and Hebron. They have officially adopted Kedumin as a sister city and spend an extensive time volunteering there. The winter tour is for college-age students and runs in late December.

During the period of the early to mid 90s, Ronn Torossian served as National President and increased Betar USA membership into the hundreds.  Previous leadership in the U.S. included; Roey Urman, Glenn Mones, Barry Liben, Fred Pierce (early to mid 70s), and Benny Rosen (60s). In addition to its programs for younger students, Betar USA also has an affiliated program for college-age students called Tagar. Betar strongly promotes the emigration of American Jews to Israel.

Previous Shaliachs in the U.S. have included Sallai Meridor, former Israel Ambassador to the U.S. (late 1980s); Eli Cohen, former Israel Ambassador to Japan (early 1990s); Tova Vagimi; Sharon Tzur; Yitzhak Kerstein; Shlomo Ariav; and Shlomi Levy.

United Kingdom
Betar UK existed in the late 1930s but had ceased functioning when the state of Israel was established. The movement's revitalization began in 1974 with Eli Joseph with the assistance of Eric Graus and George Evnine. Yisrael Medad of the World Betar Movement arrived in the UK in 1975 and built a winter camp at Sherborne School in Dorset, England, a summer camp in north-west France, and a two-week summer camp in Israel.  Branches were opened in various locations in Greater London and elsewhere. Educational and cultural activities were organized and demonstrations were held on the themes of Soviet Jewry and Jews in Arab lands as well as on local British issues. Betar shared offices with the Herut Movement at 73, Compayne Gardens, London, at the "Tel Chai House". When that property was sold, Betar held its meetings at various locations in Stamford Hill and other Greater London areas.

Anti-Zionist demonstrations and BDS picketing occurred weekly outside the flagship Marks & Spencer store on Oxford Street in London from 2004 until 2010. Betar and Tagar UK organised and led a weekly pro-Israel counter-demonstration during that period.

Betar lost its registered charity status in 2004 when the Charity Commission for England and Wales stated that Betar "appeared to be in furtherance of a political purpose rather than a charitable purpose".

Many of Betar’s members have emigrated to Israel over the years. Betar UK currently has a small active group of around 150 members, mainly in London. It is involved in Zionist activism, self-defence and martial arts training, government lobbying, criticism of what its members regard as biased, anti-Israel articles in media, and organises and supports pro-Israel demonstrations. Its website has not been updated for a number of years but Betar members are still known to be active and are considering permanent headquarters in London.

Australia
Betar Australia is an active movement with branches in Melbourne, Sydney, and Queensland. Each of these branches organizes many activities, functions, and Jewish youth camps in each state. Betar Australia is a member of the Australasian Zionist Youth Council.

Betar Australia was initially established in Melbourne and branched out to New South Wales (Sydney) and Queensland (Brisbane). In 1948, Betar members from Harbin, China and elsewhere reestablished Betar in Melbourne to help provide refuge for the many Jewish survivors of the Holocaust who remained without assistance. Later, in 1953, Betar expanded to Sydney where Betar NSW was established by Jewish immigrants from China such as their first mefaked (director) Hans Dreyer and Bob Shteinman. Further, Betar expanded to Canberra and Brisbane, although the Canberra branch did not continue to stay active. The Queensland branch celebrated its 50th reunion in 2006.

The Sydney movement has experienced various periods of expansion and contraction, reaching its zenith in the early 1990s. During that time, winter camps regularly attracted over 220 chanichim (campers). Summer camps were also large, often held in conjunction with the rest of Betar Australia. Several federal camps were held during that time, including Jamboree in Toowoomba, Queensland. Betar Australia also holds annual seminars for senior members as well as educational and training conventions for its senior leaders.

Betar has been at the forefront of Jewish activism in Australia. Betar Australia began protesting Nazi supporters and sympathizers in 1952, when it released pigeons and stink bombs during a concert by allegedly pro-Nazi German pianist Walter Gieseking in Melbourne. The group battled neo-Nazi groups in the 1960s, and in the 1970s and 1980s, it spearheaded the protests of the Sydney Jewish community on behalf of Soviet Jewry. The group was instrumental in supporting the annual protest outside the Soviet Consulate in Trelawney Street, Woollahra, which occurred each Pesach, and has supported mass protests outside the Bolshoi Ballet and the Moscow Circus on Ice at the Sydney Entertainment Centre. It also protested Soviet Foreign Minister Eduard Shevardnadze's visit to Canberra and Sydney. In the 1970s, the group demonstrated against a visit of the General Union of Palestine Students to the Australian Union of Students after the latter had moved to the political left. In later years, Betar Australia took the initiative to organize community protests outside the Iraqi Embassy in Canberra during the Gulf War and outside the Iranian Embassy to protest Iranian state sponsorship of terrorism. The group also marched in front of the German Consulate in Sydney to protest what it perceived to be a resurgence of anti-Semitism in postwar Germany. In 2004, Betar Sydney was active in protesting Dr. Hanan Ashrawi's receiving of the Sydney Premier's peace prize.

Australia Betarim very often emigrate to Israel and maintain close relations between the two nations. Betar Australia sends several members to Israel's hasbarah programs each year.

South Africa
Once one of the largest youth movements in South Africa, Betar South Africa has since dwindled greatly. Headquartered in Johannesburg, the group hosts a 3-week summer camp each December and continues annual programs to send youth to Israel. Like Betar Australia, Betar South Africa sees many of its members permanently emigrate to Israel. In recent years, Betar South Africa has closed down its yearly camp due to lack of funding. It has in recent years reconstituted itself and is focusing on the core value of Betar, and has steadily seen a rebirth of the organization.

Brazil
Betar Brasil is an active movement with branches in Porto Alegre, Rio de Janeiro, and São Paulo. Each of these branches organize consistent activities, events, both summer and winter camps (Machanot) as well as a lot of other community initiatives. There are also frequent National Seminars and some activities are carried out by all three maozim together. Betar has gained significant strength in Brazil by the end of the 2010s decade and seems to continue growing considerably. In 2018, the Betar branch in Rio de Janeiro was officially inaugurated, under the leadership of Theodor Fuchs, Nicholas Beznos, Gabriel Uram, Guilherme Jaffé, Felipe Lazkani, Gabriela Sznajderman, Eduardo Oliven, Bernardo Press, Bruno Sznajderman, Gabriel Kac Nigri, Paulo Orenbuch, Davi Beznos, Caio Cohen, and Victor Cohen. By 2019 São Paulo's branch was established too, with the leadership of Marcos Zlotnik, Raphael Harari, David Breslauer and Ilan Charchat. The revival of Betar Brasil was only possible with the help of Juliana Katz, Yael Gitelman, Mono Sommer (World Betar's Rosh Chinuch), and Nerya Meir(CEO of World Betar). In 2020, the first Hanagah Artzit was formed after decades. Jabotinsky's ideas were finally reborn in the two largest Jewish communities of the country. Today, each maoz counts with more than 50 betarím, including madrichim and chanichim.

Uruguay
One of the largest youth movements in Uruguay, Betar Uruguay has expanded greatly. Its maoz is located in Montevideo and there are weekly activities carried out as well as Jewish summer camps (Machanot) and Continental Seminars.

Italy
Recently created, the new maoz in Rome was founded by an Italian teen group, together with betarím from all over the world.

Tunisia
The group was active in Tunisia and published several periodicals, including Cahiers du Bétar.

Sports
There are a number of Betar (or "Beitar") sports teams. Included among them are Beitar Jerusalem F.C., Beitar Tel Aviv, and Beitar Jerusalem B.C., and Beitar Ramat Gan F.C..

See also
 Irgun
 Betar Naval Academy
 Kadima
 Shir Betar
 Zionist youth movement
 Betar Jerusalem FC
 "The East Bank of the Jordan" (also known as "Two Banks has the Jordan"), a poem by Ze'ev Jabotinsky that became the slogan and one of the most famous songs of Betar

References

External links

 Betar USA
 Ze'ev Jabotinsky Official website
 Betar UK (website not currently updated)

 
Youth organizations established in 1923
1923 establishments in Latvia
Zionist youth movements
Jewish youth organizations
Ze'ev Jabotinsky
Revisionist Zionism
Zionism in Europe